The 3rd Regiment, Canadian Mounted Rifles, CEF, was a mounted infantry unit of the Canadian Expeditionary Force in the First World War.

History 
The regiment was formed in November 1914 at Medicine Hat and recruited personnel in Alberta. It sailed from Montreal to England on 12 June 1915 aboard the Megantic, and after training arrived in France on September 22, 1915. It served in the field as dismounted infantry until December 1915.

On January 1, 1916, the six regiments of the Canadian Mounted Rifles were converted to infantry and reorganized into the four battalions of the 8th Canadian Infantry Brigade. The personnel of the 3rd Regiment were absorbed into the 1st and the 2nd Battalions, CMR.

Perpetuation 
In 1920, the perpetuation of the 3rd Regiment CMR was assigned to 1st Regiment, the Alberta Mounted Rifles, and it is now held by the South Alberta Light Horse.

 1st Regiment (3rd Canadian Mounted Rifles Battalion, CEF), The Alberta Mounted Rifles (1920–1931)
 1st Regiment (3rd Regiment Canadian Mounted Rifles, CEF), The Alberta Mounted Rifles (1931–1936)
 19th Alberta Dragoons (1936–1946)
 19th (Alberta) Armoured Car Regiment, RCAC (1946–1949)
 19th Alberta Armoured Car Regiment, RCAC (1949–1954)
 19th Alberta Dragoons (19th Armoured Car Regiment) (1954–1958)
 19th Alberta Dragoons (1958–2006)
 The South Alberta Light Horse (2006–present)

See also 

 List of mounted regiments in the Canadian Expeditionary Force

References 

Mounted Regiments of the Canadian Expeditionary Force
Mounted rifle regiments of Canada
Military units and formations disestablished in the 1910s
19th Alberta Dragoons
South Alberta Light Horse